Stephen "Steve" Wasil (born April 14, 1984) is a former Arena football quarterback who played for the Muskegon Thunder, Texas Copperheads, Albany Firebirds, Alabama Vipers, Kansas City Command and Tampa Bay Storm. He is currently the Offensive Coordinator at Albion College.

College career
Wasil attended Albion College, where he was a member of the football team. He still holds the records for all-time most passing yards in a game (412), most passing yards in a season (3313), and most touchdowns in a season (33). In 2005, he led the Britons to a Michigan Intercollegiate Athletic Association Championship and was named the league's Most Valuable Offensive Player.

Professional career

Muskegon Thunder
In 2007, Wasil began playing professionally for the Muskegon Thunder of the Continental Indoor Football League. He led the Thunder to a 4–8 record, but they lost the qualifying game to officially make the playoffs. He was named team MVP.

Texas Copperheads
In 2008, Wasil moved up to af2 as member of the Texas Copperheads. He played in eight games for the 2–14 Copperheads, completing 122-of-264 attempts for 1,205 yards (49 long), 15 touchdowns, 11 interceptions and rushed 12 times for 41 yards and 1 touchdown.

Albany Firebirds
In 2009, Wasil was again in af2 as member of the Albany Firebirds. The team went 7–5 with Wasil as the starter. The team sputtered with Wasil on the injured reserve list, going 0–4, and failing to qualify for the playoffs.

Alabama Vipers
In 2010, Wasil finally made it to the Arena Football League as member of the Alabama Vipers. He was the backup quarterback for the season behind Kevin Eakin. He started in place of Eakin in Week 7 against the Orlando Predators, throwing for 200 yards and two touchdowns.

Kansas City Command
In 2011, Wasil signed with the Kansas City Command. He took over as the Command starting quarterback in June, and threw 26 touchdowns and 1,385 yards. He re-signed with the Command for the 2012 season, but was later traded to the Tampa Bay Storm in exchange for 2011 Game Tape Exchange Defensive Lineman of the Year, Clifford Dukes.

Tampa Bay Storm
Wasil played the 2012 season with the Storm, leading them to an 8–10 record, failing to make it to the playoffs, but it was Wasil's most impressive season as a professional, throwing 71 touchdowns and 3,666 yards.

AFL statistics

Stats from ArenaFan:

Coaching career
Wasil retired from the AFL in 2013, after initially re-signing with the Storm. Wasil announced that he would be starting his coaching career as the quarterbacks coach for his alma mater, Albion College.

References

1984 births
Living people
American football quarterbacks
Albany Firebirds (af2) players
Alabama Vipers players
Arkansas Diamonds players
Kansas City Command players
Tampa Bay Storm players
Albion Britons football players
West Michigan ThunderHawks players
Albion Britons football coaches
People from Redford, Michigan
Players of American football from Michigan
Coaches of American football from Michigan